Sincerely, Tokyo is the debut studio album by American rapper MadeinTYO. It was released on October 26, 2018 through Private Club Records, an independent record label by MadeinTYO and his brother, 24hrs. The album features guest appearances from 24HRS, Roy Woods, Gunna, ASAP Ferg, Blood Orange and Tinashe.

It was preceded by the release of the lead single, "Ned Flanders", with featuring vocals from ASAP Ferg. The single was released on June 1, 2018. The album debuted just inside the top 100 of the US Billboard 200, at number 98.

Track listing
Credits adapted from Tidal.

Charts

Release history

References

2018 debut albums
MadeinTYO albums
Albums produced by Hit-Boy
Albums produced by Ronny J
Albums produced by TM88